This article describes the history of cricket in Pakistan from the 2000–01 season to the present.

Events
Notable Pakistan players in the 21st century include Inzamam-ul-Haq, Younis Khan, Mohammed Yousuf, Abdul Razzaq (cricketer), Saeed Ajmal, Shahid Afridi, Shoaib Akhtar, Umar Gul, and Misbah ul Haq.

National championships
Winners of the Qaid-i-Azam Trophy from 2001 have been:
 2000–01 – Lahore City Blues
 2001–02 – Karachi Whites
 2002–03 – PIA
 2003–04 – Faisalabad
 2004–05 – Peshawar
 2005–06 – Sialkot
 2006–07 – Karachi Urban

Winners of the PCB Patron's Trophy from 2001 have been:
 2000–01 – Pakistan Customs
 2001–02 – National Bank
 2002–03 – Sahiwal
 2003–04 – ZTBL
 2004–05 – Habib Bank and PIA shared
 2005–06 – National Bank
 2006–07 – Habib Bank

Winners of the One Day National Tournament from 2001 have been:
 2000–01 – Karachi Whites
 2001–02 – PIA
the trophy was renamed the PCB Patron's Cup in 2002
 2002–03 – PIA
 2003–04 – Habib Bank
 2004–05 – WAPDA
 2005–06 – Habib Bank
 2006–07 – National Bank

International tours of Pakistan

England 2000–01
 1st Test at Gaddafi Stadium, Lahore – match drawn	 
 2nd Test at Iqbal Stadium, Faisalabad – match drawn
 3rd Test at National Stadium, Karachi – England won by six wickets

Asian Test Championship 2001–02
 Pakistan v Bangladesh at Multan Cricket Stadium – Pakistan won by an innings and 264 runs	
 Pakistan v Sri Lanka at Gaddafi Stadium, Lahore – Sri Lanka won by 8 wickets

For full details of this tournament, see : 2001–02 Asian Test Championship

New Zealand 2001–02
The tour was cancelled for security reasons in the wake of the World Trade Center attack on 11 September 2001.

Three Tests had been scheduled at Arbab Niaz Stadium, Peshawar; Iqbal Stadium, Faisalabad; and the National Stadium, Karachi

West Indies 2001–02
 1st Test at Sharjah Cricket Association Stadium – Pakistan won by 170 runs
 2nd Test at Sharjah Cricket Association Stadium – Pakistan won by 244 runs

New Zealand 2002
 1st Test at Gaddafi Stadium, Lahore – Pakistan won by an innings and 324 runs	
 2nd Test at National Stadium, Karachi – game cancelled after a bomb exploded near the New Zealand team hotel on the first morning of the match

Australia 2002–03
 1st Test at P Saravanamuttu Stadium, Colombo – Australia won by 41 runs
 2nd Test at Sharjah Cricket Association Stadium – Australia won by an innings and 198 runs
 3rd Test at Sharjah Cricket Association Stadium – Australia won by an innings and 20 runs

Bangladesh 2003
 1st Test at National Stadium, Karachi – Pakistan won by 7 wickets
 2nd Test at Arbab Niaz Stadium, Peshawar – Pakistan won by 9 wickets
 3rd Test at Multan Cricket Stadium – Pakistan won by 1 wicket

For full details of this tour, see : Bangladeshi cricket team in Pakistan in 2003

India 2003–04
 1st Test at Multan Cricket Stadium – India won by an innings and 52 runs
 2nd Test at Gaddafi Stadium, Lahore – Pakistan won by 9 wickets
 3rd Test at Rawalpindi Cricket Stadium – India won by an innings and 131 runs.

South Africa 2003–04
 1st Test at Gaddafi Stadium, Lahore – Pakistan won by 8 wickets
 2nd Test at Iqbal Stadium, Faisalabad – match drawn

New Zealand 2003–04

Sri Lanka 2004–05
 1st Test at Iqbal Stadium, Faisalabad – Pakistan won by 123 runs
 2nd Test at National Stadium, Karachi – Pakistan won by 6 wickets

Zimbabwe 2004–05

England 2005–06
 1st Test at Multan Cricket Stadium – Pakistan won by 22 runs
 2nd Test at Iqbal Stadium, Faisalabad – match drawn	
 3rd Test at Gaddafi Stadium, Lahore – Pakistan won by an innings and 100 runs

For full details of this tour, see : English cricket team in Pakistan in 2005–06

India 2005–06
 1st Test at Gaddafi Stadium, Lahore – match drawn	
 2nd Test at Iqbal Stadium, Faisalabad – match drawn	
 3rd Test at National Stadium, Karachi – Pakistan won by 341 runs

For full details of this tour, see : Indian cricket team in Pakistan in 2005–06

West Indies 2006–07
 1st Test at Gaddafi Stadium, Lahore – Pakistan won by 9 wickets
 2nd Test at Multan Cricket Stadium – match drawn	
 3rd Test at National Stadium, Karachi – Pakistan won by 199 runs

For full details of this tour, see : West Indies cricket team in Pakistan in 2006–07

South Africa 2007
 1st Test at National Stadium, Karachi. South Africa won by 160 runs
 2nd Test at Gaddafi Stadium, Lahore. Match Drawn

Sri Lanka 2008–09
 1st Test at National Stadium, Karachi – Match drawn
 2nd Test at Gaddafi Stadium, Lahore – match drawn	

For full details of this tour, see : Sri Lankan cricket team in Pakistan in 2008–09

Zimbabwe 2015–16
 1st T20 at Gaddafi Stadium, Lahore – Pakistan won by 5 wickets.

Bibliography
 First Class Cricket in Pakistan (5 volumes) by Abid Ali Kazi
 Playfair Cricket Annual
 Wisden Cricketers Almanack (annual)

External sources
 CricketArchive – List of Tournaments in Pakistan

2001